The 1942 Wayne Tartars football team represented Wayne University (later renamed Wayne State University) as an independent during the 1942 college football season. The team compiled a 1–6–1 record and was outscored by opponents, 144 to 52. It played its home games at the University of Detroit Stadium.

Joe Gembis was in his 11th year as head coach. His assistant coaches, Joseph Truskowski and Ox Emerson, were lost to military service for the 1942 season. In the absence of Truskowski and Emerson, two Wayne alumni Laurence "Lefty" Russell and Ralph Betker served as assistant coaches.

Before the season began, the team held a 10-day training camp in Charlevoix, Michigan.

The team's statistical leaders included Doug Rutherford, a sophomore from Denby High School, with 58 pass completions. Frank Chorney and Donald Kennedy were the team captains.

Schedule

Roster
 Asquini, Valentino
 Beardsley, David
 Carpenter, Samuel
 Chorney, Frank
 Cotton, John
 Faughn, John
 Graham, Jack
 Hagen, Reed
 Hannan, James
 Kanfer, Morton
 Kennedy, Donald
 Magnatta, Joseph
 Malinowski, Eugene
 Meyers, Donald 
 Miller, Paul
 Mullen, Donald
 Olmstead, Richard 
 Perry, Raymond
 Raskin, Lawrence
 Rickert, Louis
 Rutherford, Douglas
 Sabo, Frank
 Tottis, Mitchell
 Young, George (Donald)

References

Wayne
Wayne State Warriors football seasons
Wayne Tartars football